KZOY (1520 AM) is a daytime-only radio station licensed for 500 watts in Sioux Falls, South Dakota. Daytime-only operation protects clear-channel stations KOKC at Oklahoma City and WWKB at Buffalo, New York. It also broadcasts on FM translator K227CZ 93.3 FM in Sioux Falls from its transmitter site near the intersection of West Madison and Marion Roads.

History

Beginnings

The construction permit for this station was first issued on November 2, 1961 to Sioux Empire Broadcasting Company, headed by Eider and Wallace Stangland.  However, the station, then known as KCHF, would not go on the air until 1971, likely due to delays in finding a suitable site to build a transmitting antenna. Studios were located at 104 East 8th Street in Sioux Falls.  A co-owned sister station, broadcasting at 93.5, had begun the year before.

Ownership

KCHF was then sold in July 1977 to Sodak Broadcasting.  Shortly afterwards, the station assumed the call letters KLYX. The station was sold again in October, 1980 to Mid-America Radio, a company headed by George Robertson.  The station then took another call sign change, this time to KRSS.

The station was sold again in 1985 to Nehemiah Radio Productions, a company headed by Jeff Sauer.  The station's call letters were changed to KJIA and adopted a Contemporary Christian format, which was maintained after another ownership change in 1993.  In June of that year, the station was purchased by CGN Corporation, a company headed by Verlyn Manning.  The call letters were then changed to KCGN, and then to KSFS in 1997 concurrent with a format change to all-sports programming.

In July 2001, the station was sold to L.A. Skywave for $155,000.  Lee Axdahl assumed the role as station general manager.  The call letters were changed to KSQB, sharing calls with its new Dell Rapids-licensed FM sister (known today as KQSF) broadcasting at 95.7.  The station would later simulcast country-formatted 107.9 KXQL at Flandreau, South Dakota as "Kool 107.9", after coming under the ownership of Backyard Broadcasting in August 2006 in a duopoly transaction.  Studios were then re-located to 500 South Phillips Avenue in Sioux Falls.

Today

Ownership of the station was transferred from Backyard Broadcasting to John E. Small's Cup O'Dirt, LLC, on May 14, 2010.  Three days later, the call letters were changed to KZOY. Concurrent with the transfer was the application for a construction permit for FM translator 93.3, which signed on the air in 2016.

Programming 
Small and his wife Heidi co-host the station's morning show.

The station is the co-flagship station of CloudCast, a syndication service providing voicetracked shows. The Smalls' morning show originates from KZOY, while WXMT, a station licensed to Smethport, Pennsylvania, provides additional dayparts.

KZOY is the one of the only radio stations in America to play the classic 80's version of the Rick Dees Weekly Top 40.

References

External links 

FCC History Cards for KZOY
Broadcasting and Cable Yearbook, 1986
Broadcasting and Cable Yearbook, 1993
Broadcasting and Cable Yearbook, 1998
Broadcasting and Cable Yearbook, 2002-03
Broadcasting and Cable Yearbook, 2008

ZOY
Oldies radio stations in the United States
Radio stations established in 1971
ZOY